The following is a list of notable events and releases of the year 1943 in Norwegian music.

Events

Deaths

 April
 1 – Anders Hovden, classical pianist, composer and radio personality (born 1860).

Births

 March
 20 – Jon Christensen, jazz drummer.

 April
 23 – Knut "Sputnik" Storbukås, musician and truck driver.

 August
 10 – Bjørn Krokfoss, jazz drummer.
 28 – Anne-Lise Berntsen, soprano singer (died 2012).

 October
 6 – Bjøro Håland, country singer

 November
 12
 Julie Ege, singer, actress, and model (died 2008).
 Thorgeir Stubø, jazz guitarist and composer (died 1986).

 December
 3 – Bjørn Boysen, organist (died 2018).
 30 – Øyvind Klingberg, pianist and showman, Dizzie Tunes (died 2017).

See also
 1943 in Norway
 Music of Norway

References

 
Norwegian music
Norwegian
Music
1940s in Norwegian music